Gustav Altenhain (December 5, 1891 in Sprockhövel (Sauerland) - December 23, 1968 in Gevelsberg (Sauerland)) was a German publisher and politician of the Free Democratic Party (FDP).

After attending school, and attending an arts and crafts college, Altenhain took over as the holder of the management of a printing company. There is a street named after him today in Sprockhövel where his printing company was located.

Altenhain joined the German Democratic Party (DDP) in 1918 and remained with it during the merger with the Young German Order in 1930. From 1925 to 1933, Altenhain was one of the official representatives of Haßlinghausen, from 1926 to 1933 a member of the Kreisausschuss Ennepe-Ruhr code, and from 1929 to 1933 one of the Councilors of Haßlinghausen. From 1927 to 1929 and 1946, he served a member of the county council and was also a deputy member of the Zonenbeirat under the British zone of occupation at the end of the war whilst serving as the mayor of the city in 1945 and 1946.

After World War II, Altenhain was involved in the creation of the Liberal Democratic Party in Westphalia, which on 7 January 1946 in Opladen led to the formation of the Free Democratic Party (FDP). At its founding congress, he was elected as one of six vice-chairmen, confirmed in June 1947. He was also chairman of the FDP-Westphalia and, after the formation of the Landtag of North Rhine-Westphalia in May 1947 its chairman. However, this role was short-lived as he was seen too left wing, and was replaced in August 1947 in a vote by Friedrich Middelhauve. From 1947 to 1958, though, he was elected as a Landtagsabgeordneter for the Landtag and was deputy chairman for some years, and as Vice Chair of the Personnel Committee and Vice Chair of the Committee on Budget and Finance from 1950 to 1955. Overall he was a representative of the North Rhine-Westphalia Landtag from October 2, 1946 until July 12, 1958.

From early 1952, he belonged to an intra-party group led by Carl Wirths and Karl Schneider, pursued by Middelhauve and Ernst Achenbach and was sharply criticized. From 1950 to 1954 he was also Second Vice-President of the Diet and from 1953 to 1964 served as Member of the National Assembly of Westfalen-Lippe.

References

Literature
50 Jahre Landtag Nordrhein-Westfalen. Das Land und seine Abgeordneten. Düsseldorf 1996.

1891 births
1968 deaths
People from Sprockhövel
People from the Province of Westphalia
German Democratic Party politicians
Free Democratic Party (Germany) politicians
German publishers (people)